The Battle of Solomon’s Fork only lasted one day, but the remaining pursuit of fleeing Cheyenne warriors, led by Colonel Edwin 'Bull' Sumner, lasted from July 29 until August 18. Sumner and his cavalry of 300 troops' journey took place from May 1857 to July 9, longer than the battle itself.

This battle is not highly regarded by historians, and they debate its importance. Some say that this particular skirmish is a critical event in the history of conflict between the U.S. Army and the Native peoples. In contrast, others state that it is simply a single moment in the U.S.’s effort to overtake Native land.

Background 
Years before the battle of Solomon’s Fork, the Cheyenne people had relative peace with the white settlers; they had not started to encroach on their territory yet. The entirety of the Cheyenne people totaled close to 3,000 members, including 900 warriors. While the Cheyenne were peaceful with white settlers, they were not so friendly with other tribes.

To the Cheyenne people, having a fighting spirit was encouraged and welcomed among the young men of the tribe. To be killed in battle while in their prime was seen as a great honor, and to live to old age was disagreeable.

Trouble began when the Sioux people killed 31 United States soldiers at the 1854 Grattan Massacre. In March of 1856. Colonel William Selby Harney joined Sioux leaders at a peace meeting at Fort Pierre. This meeting included Cheyenne’s and Arapahos peoples, and Harney demanded that they all make peace with each other and withdraw from the Platte River territory. If they did not do so, they would be "wiped from the face of the earth."

The Cheyenne agreed to avoid any conflict with the United States Army. However, several events following the agreement proved that they could not. Numerous incidents, including accusations of theft from U.S. soldiers, murder of innocents on both sides of the conflict, and fear tactics from U.S. soldiers left tensions high and distrust between the two factions.

The Cheyenne attacked emigrant wagon trains as revenge for an attack from U.S. troops that killed ten of their people and injured another eight. These attacks on the wagon trains led to the killing of twelve whites and the kidnapping of two. General Persifor E. Smith, commander of the Department of the West, demanded severe punishment for the Cheyenne attacks. At the time, the U.S. Army was busy trying to keep the peace between pro-slavery groups and the Kansas Free-Staters separate, so Smith suggested a delayed operation against the Cheyenne for later the following year. The Secretary of War, Jefferson Davis, agreed.

Journey to Kansas 

In May 1857, Colonel 'Bull' Sumner led his four cavalry march of 300 soldiers and Pawnee scouts out of Fort Leavenworth. Major John Sedgwick would be taking the southbound route with the 1st Cavalry, forty wagons, and five Delaware scouts. Sumner’s course was supposed to lead to the west bank of the Platte and North Platte rivers, a known Cheyenne territory.

In early June, Sumner's party encountered their first obstacle. The river was swollen from the heavy snowmelt from winter and freezing water. The 300 men and horses tried to cross, but several men and horses drowned on the way across.

After the river disaster, the company encountered a hot and dry plain that Wagon Master Percival G. Lowe described as "thirty miles across…the hottest place this side of the Dives, and…about as dry."

On June 30, the company came across what was once a tiny stream but was now a 100-yard-wide swamp. Troops had to make their dirt road around the marsh, unwilling to lose more to drowning. Eventually, Sumner discovered that his two guides did not know the location of the meeting point for their other company of troops under Sedgwick.

While the U.S. troops were the elements to reach Kansas, the Cheyenne people prepared for war. While on a buffalo hunt, the two sectors of the Cheyenne people discovered that the United States army was hunting them. They decided to remain together for safety and prepare for the attack. Soon, the Delaware and Pawnee scouts discovered fresh tracks of Natives. They led Sumner on a five-day trek with only 50 men and no supplies strait to the Cheyenne encampment. However, 300 Cheyenne were lined up and ready for battle.

Battle 

Medicine men of the Cheyenne people performed protection rituals on their warriors. They were made to believe that they would be impervious to firearms, and they calmly met Sumner and his small troop with this belief in their hearts.

Sumner and his bare army decided to attack that afternoon, even though the rest of his infantry and artillery were miles behind him. Sumner and his troop pulled their sabers from their sides and charged on his command, sans firepower. In the face of blades instead of guns, the conviction of many of the Cheyenne warriors diminished.

In the battle's confusion, many troops and Natives resorted to hand-to-hand fighting. Many Cheyenne fled to the north bank of the Saline River, their current camp, to accommodate the increased number of Cheyenne warriors. The troops and Cheyenne broke off into more minor skirmishes over a five-mile radius, most notably with Lieutenant James E.B. Stuart. Stuart came to a fellow Lieutenant and friend’s aid and was shot by a Native who took his gun. Stuart survived and later became a famous Cavalry Commander in the Civil War.

At the end of the battle, two soldiers were killed, eight wounded. On the Cheyenne side, nine were killed, but the Cheyenne declared only four of their warriors dead. The battle lasted only one day, as Sumner received orders to send most of his Cavalry to protect a Mormon expedition in Salt Lake City.

Aftermath 

Although the U.S. Army technically won this battle, it did not bring peace to the Great Plains.

While scholars still argue about this battle's importance, it is the first major battle to take place between the United States and the Cheyenne. This attack was the beginning of total warfare between the United States and the Cheyenne. Several skirmishes and conflicts, such as the Fort Robinson Massacre and the Sand Creek Massacre, left many Northern Cheyenne starving, scattered, and on the run from the U.S. military.  The exodus of the Northern Cheyenne from their Southern counterparts resulted in the loss of an untold number of members, something that many Cheyenne were reluctant to talk about until several generations later.

Today, the Northern Cheyenne Reservation is located in southeastern Montana and is approximately 444,000 acres large. The tribe has roughly 12,266 enrolled members. About 6,012 of these members reside on the reservation.

References

Further reading 

 Cheyennes and Horse Soldiers: The 1857 Expedition and the Battle of Solomon’s Fork

Battles in Kansas
Battles involving the Cheyenne
Graham County, Kansas
1857 in Kansas Territory